is a 1992 anime film, based on the Italian novel by Gianni Padoan. It was dubbed into English and distributed by Celebrity Home Entertainment in 1993 under the title of "The Secret of the Seal".

Plot 
After his mother's death, Antonio (nicknamed  in Sardinian language) and his father move to Sardinia, where Tottòi's father grew up as a boy. Tottòi's adventures begin when he sees a monk seal, despite the common belief that they had long since died out.

Voice Cast

External links
 Nippon Animation Official Site (Japanese)
 Nippon Animation Official Site (English)
 

1992 films
Japanese animated films
1992 anime films
Nippon Animation films
Films set in Sardinia